Special and differential treatment (S&D) is a set of GATT provisions (GATT 1947, Article XVIII) that exempts developing countries from the same strict trade rules and disciplines of more industrialized countries.

That is, developed countries will treat developing countries differently.

In the Uruguay Round Agreement on Agriculture, for example, developing countries are given longer time periods to phase in export subsidy and tariff reductions than the more industrialized countries.  The least developed countries are exempt from any reduction commitments.

See also
National treatment

References

Foreign direct investment
General Agreement on Tariffs and Trade
International law
World Trade Organization